Puyang County is a county in the northeast of Henan province, China. It is under the administration of the prefecture-level city of Puyang.

Administrative divisions
As 2012, this county is divided to 8 towns and 12 townships.
Towns

Townships

Education

Puyang County No. 3 Experimental School, as of 2017, had 1,704 students, and 62 teachers. The average class size was 71 students per class. Many parents from rural areas send their children to this school because their local schools had closed. Yuan Suwen and Li Rongde wrote in Caixin that it "is considered one of the few good schools in the area." In March 2017 a stampede occurred at the school, injuring 22 children and killing one.

References

County-level divisions of Henan
Puyang